Hierocles (late 2nd century – 222 AD) was reputedly a favourite and lover of the Roman Emperor Elagabalus.

Most of the descriptions of his life are given by Cassius Dio and the Historia Augusta. Hierocles was from Caria in Anatolia, and was at some point enslaved, later becoming a charioteer in the service of Elagabalus. Initially, he was a lover and student of another charioteer named Gordius.

Elagabalus was said to have been captivated by the blond and youthful Hierocles when the athlete fell in front of him during a chariot race. The Emperor made him his lover and husband and, as a consequence, Hierocles was alleged to have gained significant political influence. His mother, a slave, was promoted to be equal among wives of ex-consuls. Hierocles banished the Emperor's other lover, athlete Aurelius Zoticus, and inflicted physical violence upon Elagabalus when the latter was unfaithful.

After Elagabalus granted Hierocles his freedom, he wanted Hierocles to be declared caesar, against the opposition of his grandmother, Julia Maesa. Allegedly, Elagabalus' partiality towards Hierocles, coupled with his eccentricities, were the principal reasons he lost the support of the Praetorian Guard, which led to his death. When the  Emperor fell from power in 222, and was assassinated by the Praetorian Guard, Hierocles was executed, along with other members of Elagabalus's court.

References

2nd-century births
222 deaths
3rd-century Romans
Ancient chariot racing
Ancient LGBT people
Ancient Roman sportspeople
Carian people
Emperor's slaves and freedmen
Gay men
Husbands of Roman emperors
LGBT history in Italy
Roman Caria
Severan dynasty
Spouses of Elagabalus